"Lost in My Mind" is a 2018 song by Rüfüs Du Sol.

Lost in My Mind may also refer to:

 "Lost in My Mind", a song by the Head and the Heart from the 2011 album The Head and the Heart

See also
 "Losin' My Mind", a song by En Vogue from the 2004 album Soul Flower
 Lose My Mind (disambiguation)
 Lost My Mind (disambiguation)